Thiago Rocha da Cunha, Thiaguinho (Rio de Janeiro, November 22, 1984) is a Brazilian footballer who currently plays for Sport Recife since 12 January 2011. He had last played for Fluminense.

References

1984 births
Living people
Footballers from Rio de Janeiro (city)
Brazilian footballers
Botafogo de Futebol e Regatas players
Fluminense FC players
Sport Club do Recife players
América Futebol Clube (RN) players
ABC Futebol Clube players
Campeonato Brasileiro Série A players
Association football midfielders
Association football fullbacks